Sekolah Menengah Kebangsaan Bakar Arang (SMK Bakar Arang) is a public Malay secondary school located in Sungai Petani, Kedah, Malaysia established in 2003. As of 2014, the school contains 897 male and 687 female students, in total 1584 students. There are 111 teachers teaching in the school.

Principals

Fake bomb threat
On 23 October 2016, a teacher receives a bomb threat from an unknown person. After police investigation, it was verified as a fake call.

Gallery

References

External links

 Facebook Sekolah Menengah Kebangsaan Bakar Arang
 Frog VLE

Kuala Muda District
Schools in Kedah
Secondary schools in Malaysia
Educational institutions established in 2003
2003 establishments in Malaysia